Heinrich Seelheim (15 August 1884 – 18 December 1964) was a German geographer and diplomat, who was a member of Wilhelm Filchner's Second German Antarctic Expedition  in 1911–13.  In 1910, to gain polar travel experience, he participated with Filchner and others in a trial expedition to Spitsbergen. He was in charge of the first leg of the Antarctic expedition, between Germany and Buenos Aires, while Filchner remained in Germany. Seelheim resigned from the expedition in Buenos Aires, because of disputes with the ship's captain, Richard Vahsel. After  the First World War, Seelheim entered the diplomatic service, and was subsequently German consul in Winnipeg, Canada,  and Yokohama, Japan.

References

1884 births
1964 deaths
German polar explorers
German diplomats
German geographers
20th-century geographers